Protoerigone is a genus of Polynesian sheet weavers that was first described by A. D. Blest in 1979.

Species
 it contains only two species:
Protoerigone obtusa Blest, 1979 – New Zealand
Protoerigone otagoa Blest, 1979 (type) – New Zealand

See also
 List of Linyphiidae species (I–P)

References

Araneomorphae genera
Linyphiidae
Spiders of New Zealand